Sergei Abuyezidovich Tashuyev (Russian: Сергей Абуезидович Ташуев; born 1 January 1959) is a Russian professional football coach who is the manager of Akhmat Grozny. He grew up in Grozny before making the world of football his career.

Early coaching career 
Tashuyev began his coaching career in 1992 for a team from Budennovsk that played in the Second Division. He took a break from coaching between 1993 and 1996 after which he returned to lead another Second Division team from the Kabardino-Balkaria town of Baksan.

Sergei Tashuyev has coached at a number of teams in the Russian Second Division including Spartak-SWC, FC Luhovicy and Serpukhov and Vladikavkaz. Leading up to his appointment at FC Anzhi Makhachkal, Tashuyev held manager and coach positions at several First Division clubs in Russia. He was the head coach for Belgorod and FC Krasnodar. He was also briefly on the coaching staff of FC Spartan Nalchick and won his first game as a Russian Premier League manager for PFC Spartak Nalchik on 26 June 2011. Immediately prior to joining FC Anzhi Makhachkal, Tashuyev was a manager of FC Metalurh Donetsk.

Anzhi Makhachkala 
After a drastic budget cut, FC Anzhi Makhachkala suffered a number of significant player losses. After a difficult season, the club was relegated to the First Division, losing their Premier League status. Tashuyev was appointed as manager and head coach in May 2014, replacing Gadzhi Gadzhiyev.

Akhmat Grozny 
On 22 September 2022, Tashuyev was hired as manager of Russian Premier League club Akhmat Grozny until the end of the 2022–23 season.

References

External links
 Profile at Footballfacts 

1959 births
Living people
People from Kharkiv Oblast
Chechen people
Russian people of Chechen descent
Russian football managers
FC Krasnodar managers
PFC Spartak Nalchik managers
FC Metalurh Donetsk managers
FC Anzhi Makhachkala managers
FC Kuban Krasnodar managers
FC Shakhtyor Soligorsk managers
FC Akhmat Grozny managers
Russian Premier League managers
Ukrainian Premier League managers
Russian expatriate football managers
Expatriate football managers in Ukraine
Russian expatriate sportspeople in Ukraine
Expatriate football managers in Belarus